My Best Friend's Girl is a 1983 French comedy film directed by Bertrand Blier and starring Isabelle Huppert.

Cast
 Coluche as Micky
 Isabelle Huppert as Viviane
 Thierry Lhermitte as Pascal
 François Perrot as The doctor
 Daniel Colas as The flirt
 Frederique Michot
 Farid Chopel as The hoodlum

See also
 Isabelle Huppert on screen and stage

References

External links
 

1983 films
1983 comedy films
Films directed by Bertrand Blier
French comedy films
1980s French-language films
Films produced by Claude Berri
Films produced by Alain Sarde
Films with screenplays by Gérard Brach
1980s French films